The discography of Colbie Caillat, an American musician and singer-songwriter, contains six studio albums, seven extended plays, one compilation album, twenty-two singles (including six as a featured artist), twenty-two music videos and other album appearances and songwriting credits. Caillat rose to fame through social networking website Myspace. At that time, she was the number-one unsigned artist of her genre. After signing with Universal Republic, she released debut album in July 2007, Coco has sold 2,060,000 copies in the United States and is certified 2× Platinum. In August 2009, she released Breakthrough, her second album which became her first album to debut at number one on Billboard 200. It has been certified Gold by RIAA. In July 2011, she released her third studio album, All of You. In October 2012 she released her first Christmas album, Christmas in the Sand. Caillat sold 11 million albums and 25 million singles worldwide.

Albums

Studio albums

Compilation albums

Extended plays

Singles

As lead artist

As featured artist

Promotional singles

Other charted songs

Other appearances

Music videos

Writing credits

Notes

References

Discography
Discographies of American artists
Pop music discographies
Folk music discographies